Tanya Eleni Kalivas (born 26 August 1979), known in Greece as Tanya Kalyvas, is an American-born Greek former footballer who played as a midfielder. She has been a member of the Greece women's national team.

College career
Kalivas attended the Princeton University in Princeton, New Jersey.

Club career
Kalivas played for the California Storm in the WPSL.

International career
Kalivas was one of eight American-born players that competed for the Greece women's national football team at the 2004 Summer Olympics. She participated in the build-up to the Olympic tournament by playing in several friendlies, including a draw with Russia on 22 February 2004. She made two appearances at the final tournament as Greece finished last.

References

1979 births
Living people
Women's association football midfielders
Greek women's footballers
Greece women's international footballers
Olympic footballers of Greece
Footballers at the 2004 Summer Olympics
American women's soccer players
Soccer players from New Jersey
Sportspeople from Bergen County, New Jersey
People from Franklin Lakes, New Jersey
American people of Greek descent
Sportspeople of Greek descent
Citizens of Greece through descent
Princeton Tigers women's soccer players
Women's Premier Soccer League players
California Storm players